Chase Josey (born March 31, 1995) is an American snowboarder who competed in the halfpipe at the 2018 Winter Olympics. He competed at the 2022 Winter Olympics.

References

External links
 
 
 
 

1995 births
People from Hailey, Idaho
Sportspeople from Idaho
Olympic snowboarders of the United States
American male snowboarders
Snowboarders at the 2018 Winter Olympics
Snowboarders at the 2022 Winter Olympics
Living people
21st-century American people